Gustaf Lindblom may refer to:

 Gustaf Lindblom (athlete) (1891–1960), Swedish Olympic triple-jumper
 Gustaf Lindblom (fencer) (1883–1976), Swedish Olympic fencer